Vern B. Gardner (May 14, 1925 – August 26, 1987) was an American basketball player.  He was a two-time consensus All-American at the University of Utah and played three seasons with the Philadelphia Warriors.

Vern Gardner was a 6'5 forward/center who played at Star Valley High School in Afton, Wyoming and played collegiately at the University of Utah, where he was a second team consensus All-American in 1947 and 1949.  Gardner led the Utes to the NIT championship in 1947, at a time where this tournament was considered as prestigious as the NCAA Tournament is today.  Gardner was named tournament MVP.  His number 33 was retired by the University of Utah.

After the completion of his college career, Gardner was selected in the first round of the 1949 BAA draft by the Philadelphia Warriors. Gardner played three seasons for the Warriors, averaging 8.9 points per game over his career.

Following his retirement from the BAA, Gardner became a high school coach and teacher, first at his alma mater Star Valley High, then at Bonneville High School in Ogden, Utah.  Gardner died of a stroke on August 26, 1987.

Career statistics

NBA

Source

Regular season

Playoffs

References

External links

 NBA stats

1925 births
1987 deaths
All-American college men's basketball players
American men's basketball players
Basketball players from Wyoming
Centers (basketball)
High school basketball coaches in the United States
People from Afton, Wyoming
Philadelphia Warriors draft picks
Philadelphia Warriors players
Power forwards (basketball)
Utah Utes men's basketball players